Karam Hasanov Avaz oglu (born 2 August 1969) is an Azerbaijani politician serving as the Chairman of State Property Issues Committee of Azerbaijan Republic.

Hasanov was born on 2 August 1969. He was appointed the Chairman of State Property Issues Committee on 19 May 2009, when the committee was established. Hasanov is an economist by profession.

See also
Cabinet of Azerbaijan

References 

1969 births
Living people
21st-century Azerbaijani economists
Government ministers of Azerbaijan
Azerbaijan State University of Economics alumni
20th-century Azerbaijani economists